David Morse (born 1938) is a British literary author and former lecturer in the School of English and American Studies at the University of Sussex. He was an early authority on Motown but is now best known for his work on Romanticism and the culture and times of the Victorian age.  His seminal work, High Victorian Culture, was described by The Times Literary Supplement as ‘an illuminating survey work by a robust and powerful intelligence with an impressive grasp of a great deal of material’.

Life
David Morse was born in 1938 and educated at Bedford Modern School and King's College, Cambridge, where he contributed to Granta, was editor of The Cambridge Review and was awarded an ACLS Fellowship to study American theatre.

Morse became a lecturer in the School of English and American Studies at the University of Sussex. He was an early authority on Motown but is now best known for his work on Romanticism and the culture and times of the Victorian age.  His seminal work, High Victorian Culture, was described by The Times Literary Supplement as ‘an illuminating survey work by a robust and powerful intelligence with an impressive grasp of a great deal of material’.

Selected bibliography
 Motown And The Arrival Of Black Music.  Published by Macmillan Publishers, New York City, 1971
 Grandfather Rock: The New Poetry And The Old.  Published by Delacorte Press, New York City, 1972
 Perspectives On Romanticism: A Transformational Analysis.  Published by Barnes & Noble, 1981
 Romanticism: A Structural Analysis.  Published by Barnes & Noble, 1982
 American Romanticism.  Published by Barnes & Noble, 1987 
 American Romanticism.  Vol.1, From Cooper To Hawthorne: Excessive America.  Published by Macmillan Publishers, London, 1987
 American Romanticism.  Vol.2, From Melville To James.  Published by Macmillan Publishers, 1987 
 England's Time Of Crisis: From Shakespeare To Milton: A Cultural History.  Published by St. Martin’s Press, New York City, 1989
 High Victorian Culture.  Published by New York University Press, 1993 
 The Age Of Virtue: British Culture From The Restoration To Romanticism.  Published by St. Martin’s Press, New York City, 2000

References

External links
 David Morse at WorldCat Identities

1938 births
Living people
Academics of the University of Sussex
British writers
Alumni of King's College, Cambridge
People educated at Bedford Modern School